Lidzbark is a town in Warmian-Masurian Voivodeship, Poland.

Lidzbark may also refer to:

Gmina Lidzbark, an urban-rural gmina (administrative district) with seat at Lidzbark
Lidzbark-Nadleśnictwo, a settlement in Gmina Lidzbark
Lake Lidzbark
Lidzbark Warmiński, a larger town, also in Warmian-Masurian Voivodeship
Gmina Lidzbark Warmiński, a gmina with seat at Lidzbark Warmiński
Lidzbark County, a larger administrative district also with seat at Lidzbark Warmiński